Group C of the 1999 Fed Cup Europe/Africa Zone Group II was one of four pools in the Europe/Africa zone of the 1999 Fed Cup. Five teams competed in a round robin competition, with the top team advancing to Group I for 2000.

Morocco vs. Lithuania

Estonia vs. Cyprus

Estonia vs. Lithuania

Cyprus vs. Kenya

Morocco vs. Cyprus

Estonia vs. Kenya

Morocco vs. Kenya

Lithuania vs. Cyprus

Morocco vs. Estonia

Lithuania vs. Kenya

  placed first in this group and thus advanced to Group I for 2000, where they placed last in their pool of five and was thus relegated back to Group II for 2001.

See also
Fed Cup structure

References

External links
 Fed Cup website

1999 Fed Cup Europe/Africa Zone